Shori-sha  is a 1957 color Japanese film directed by Umetsugu Inoue.

Cast 
Tatsuya Mihashi as Yamashiro Kikichi
 Yujiro Ishihara as Buma Shuntarō 
Yoko Minamida as Miyagawa Natsuko
Mie Kitahara as Shiraki Mari
Jo Shishido as Ishiyama
Taiji Tonoyama
Tour Abe
Akira Kobayashi

References

External links 
 

1957 films
Films directed by Umetsugu Inoue
Nikkatsu films
1950s Japanese films